The Fort White Public School Historic District is a U.S. historic district (designated on December 1, 1989) located in Fort White, Florida. The district is near the intersection of East Dorch and North Bryant Streets. It contains 3 historic buildings.

The original Fort White High School was constructed during 1915 in the masonry vernacular. The building included an Italianate tower and an auditorium was added in 1936. Separate elementary school classrooms were completed in 1938.

References

External links
 Columbia County listings at National Register of Historic Places

Buildings and structures in Columbia County, Florida
Historic districts on the National Register of Historic Places in Florida
National Register of Historic Places in Columbia County, Florida